Fernando Ureña Rib (21 March 1951 – 27 December 2013) was a Dominican painter, whose career spanned four decades.

Born in La Romana, La Romana Province, Rib began his career in 1973 and studied at the Universidad Autónoma de Santo Domingo. He was fluent in Spanish, English, French, German and Italian.

Fernando Ureña Rib died on 27 December 2013, aged 62, at a health center in Berlin, Germany.

References

1951 births
2013 deaths
People from La Romana, Dominican Republic
Dominican Republic painters
Universidad Autónoma de Santo Domingo alumni